The Ministry of Gender,  Social Welfare and Religious Affairs is a ministry of the Government of South Sudan. The incumbent minister is Agnes Kwaje Lasuba, while Priscilla Nyangyang Joseph serves as deputy minister.

List of Ministers of Gender, Social Welfare and Religious Affairs

References

Gender, Social Welfare and Religious Affairs
South Sudan
South Sudan, Gender, Social Welfare and Religious Affairs